This is a list of the National Register of Historic Places listings in Gillespie County, Texas.

This is intended to be a complete list of properties and districts listed on the National Register of Historic Places in Gillespie County, Texas. There are three districts and 17 individually listed properties within the county. One district is a National Natural Landmark while another contains a National Historic Landmark that is also a State Antiquities Landmark, while the third holds a State Antiquities Landmark and multiple Recorded Texas Historic Landmarks some of which are individually listed properties. The individual properties include a National Historic Landmark that is also a State Antiquities Landmark, two additional State Antiquities Landmarks, and six Recorded Texas Historic Landmarks.

Current listings

The locations of National Register properties and districts may be seen in a mapping service provided.

|}

See also

National Register of Historic Places listings in Texas
Recorded Texas Historic Landmarks in Gillespie County

References

External links

 
.
Gillespie
Gillespie County, Texas
.